The name Humblotia can refer to two different genera of organisms:
The bird genus Humblotia, containing a single species - Humblot's flycatcher (Humblotia flavirostris).
The plant genus Humblotia, a synonym for Drypetes.